The Department of Local Government, Sport and Cultural Industries is a department of the Government of Western Australia. The department was formed on 1 July 2017, out of the former Department of Culture and the Arts, Department of Local Government and Communities, Department of Racing, Gaming and Liquor and the Department of Sport and Recreation.

A restructuring of the Western Australian government departments was part of Mark McGowan's election campaign and, in the month after taking office, the number of government departments was reduced from 41 to 25.

The department is responsible for the support the Western Australian economy through effective regulation and the facilitation of sporting and cultural experiences and opportunities.

In May 2021, the department was one of eight Western Australian Government departments to receive a new Director General with Lanie Chopping being appointed to the role effective from 31 May 2021 after her predecessor, Duncan Ord, had retired.

References

External links
 Government of Western Australia website
 Department of Local Government, Sport and Cultural Industries

Local
2017 establishments in Australia
Government agencies established in 2017
Local government areas of Western Australia